Chindu County or Chenduo County is a county of Qinghai Province, China, bordering Sichuan to the east. It is under the administration of Yushu Tibetan Autonomous Prefecture.

Administrative divisions
Chindu County (Chenduo County) is divided to 5 towns and 2 townships.
Towns

Townships
 Gaduo Township
 Labu Township

Climate 

Chindu County has a alpine climate (Köppen climate classification ETH).

References

County-level divisions of Qinghai
Yushu Tibetan Autonomous Prefecture